Jönssonligan spelar högt (English: The Johnson Gang at High Stakes) is a Swedish film about the gang Jönssonligan made in 2000.

Plot
Dynamit-Harry and Vanheden have left the criminal life behind them. Together with Harry's wife they are managing a small company together AB Alltjänst (roughly General Servicing Ltd). But when Sickan's maternal grandmother suspects that Wall-Enberg is shutting down theaters like La Scala they contact Sickans brother Sven-Ingvar "Sivan" Jönsson who has a plan. They are going to steal a computer floppy disc with bank account numbers worth 60 billion kronor.

Cast
Johan Ulveson - Sven-Ingvar "Sivan" Jönsson
Ulf Brunnberg - Ragnar Vanheden
Björn Gustafson - Dynamit-Harry
Birgitta Andersson - Doris
Margreth Weivers - Grandma Jönsson
Per Grundén - Wall-Enberg
Weiron Holmberg - Biffen
Helge Skoog - Operachief Waldemar Gustafsson
Johan Rabaeus - Signore
Ola Forssmed - Roberto
Dan Ekborg - Bajron
Henrietta Indahl - Soprano
Björn Hallman - Maestro
Rolf Skoglund - Gregor
Bert Gradin - Police

Reception
Aftonbladet rated the film 2/5, calling it "the worst part of the series so far".

References

External links

Swedish comedy films
Jönssonligan films
2000 films
2000s Swedish-language films
2000s Swedish films